Kyle Ross (born May 12, 1983) was a professional box lacrosse player for the Washington Stealth, Toronto Rock, Boston Blazers and Minnesota Swarm in the National Lacrosse League. Ross was drafted 44th overall in the 2004 NLL draft. He stopped playing after the 2012 season. Internationally, he represented the Czech Republic at the 2007, 2011, and 2015 World Indoor Lacrosse Championships.

Statistics

References

External links
Stats at NLL.com

1983 births
Living people
Boston Blazers players
Canadian lacrosse players
Minnesota Swarm players
National Lacrosse League players
Sportspeople from New Westminster
Toronto Rock players
Washington Stealth players